Hüvasti, kollane kass ("Farewell, yellow cat") is the debut novel of Estonian author Mati Unt. It was first published in 1963.

Estonian novels
1963 novels
1963 debut novels